Châtelet–Les Halles is a major train hub in Paris and one of the largest underground stations in the world. Opened in 1977, it is the central transit hub for the Paris metropolitan area, connecting three of five RER commuter-rail lines and five of sixteen Métro lines. It is named after the nearby Place du Châtelet public square and Les Halles, the former wholesale food market of Paris, now a shopping mall.

Terminology

Formally, the name Châtelet–Les Halles designates the RER station alone. Informally, it refers to the hub comprising the eponymous RER station (served by RER A, RER B and RER D) plus the contiguous Paris Métro stations Châtelet (served by Line 1, Line 4, Line 7, Line 11 and Line 14) and Les Halles (served by Line 4).

For purposes of wayfinding, the massive three station complex is broken up into three sectors: Forum, Rivoli and Seine.

Forum sector
The Forum sector is named after the adjoining Forum des Halles shopping mall, which is accessible from this part of the station. The sector includes the RER platforms and the Les Halles station on Paris Métro Line 4. The exits located in the sector are numbered 1 through 9.

Rivoli sector
The Rivoli sector is below and named after the Rue de Rivoli, a major road known for its shopping and includes the Châtelet station of Line 1, Line 4 and Line 14 of the Paris Métro. The exits located in the sector are numbered 10 through 14.

Seine sector
The Seine sector is named after the nearby Seine and includes the Châtelet station of Line 7 and Line 11 of the Paris Métro. The exits located in the sector are  numbered 15 through 19.

RER station layout 
The tracks of all three RER lines are oriented parallel along an east–west direction. The seven tracks are grouped on four platforms, with the outer platforms reserved for RER A and RER B and the central ones for RER D. This enables easy cross-platform connections between RER A and RER B trains traveling in the same direction, and a solution for those RER D trains which use the station as a terminus.

Renovation
A major renovation of the station complex and adjoining Forum des Halles shopping mall was completed in 2018, with the main aim of improving safety in the event of an emergency evacuation at peak traffic time. The renovation included the construction of a major new entrance at Place Marguerite de Navarre, with direct access to the RER station hall; the complete renovation and enlargement of the RER station hall; and extension of key escalators to lower levels of the station.

See also
List of Paris Métro stations
List of RER stations

References

Réseau Express Régional stations
Railway stations in France opened in 1977
Buildings and structures in the 1st arrondissement of Paris